The Kinney Octagon Barn was a historic agricultural building located just north of Burr Oak, Iowa, United States. Lorenzo Coffin was a stock breeder and the farm editor of the Fort Dodge Messenger.  He is thought to have built the first round barn in Iowa in 1867.  The modified hip roof and heavy timber construction of this barn, built in 1880, suggests that it was a Coffin-type octagon barn.  It was added to the National Register of Historic Places on November 19, 1986.  It has subsequently been torn down.

References

External links
 Some Winneshiek County historic and interesting sites
 Dale Travis' Iowa round barns list

Infrastructure completed in 1880
National Register of Historic Places in Winneshiek County, Iowa
Barns on the National Register of Historic Places in Iowa
Octagon barns in the United States